Kiwa is a genus of marine decapods living at deep-sea hydrothermal vents and cold seeps. The animals are commonly referred to as "yeti lobsters" or "yeti crabs", after the legendary yeti, because of their "hairy" or bristly appearance. The genus is placed in its own family, Kiwaidae, in the superfamily Chirostyloidea.

Five species have been described: Kiwa hirsuta discovered in 2005 on the Pacific-Antarctic Ridge, Kiwa puravida discovered in 2006 at cold seeps in the East Pacific (all other species are from hydrothermal vents), Kiwa tyleri, known colloquially as the "Hoff crab", from the East Scotia Ridge, and Kiwa araonae from the Australian-Antarctic Ridge. Two similar but undescribed species are known from vents on the South West Indian Ridge and at the Galápagos respectively. Analysis of DNA has confirmed the distinction of the species, them having diverged from each other millions of years ago. The third undescribed species of Kiwa was discovered in 2010 in the Atlantic sector of the Southern Ocean at vents on the East Scotia Ridge. Compared with the first two species, it has proportionally much shorter chelae, with the majority of the bacteria-growing setae concentrated on the ventral carapace.

Based on the presence of sulphur-oxidising bacteria on the setae of both K. hirsuta and the new South West Indian Ridge species, they may both feed on bacteria in addition to scavenging. For K. puravida, the bacteria have been identified and the feeding behaviour observed, as well as a cyclical rhythmic motion of the crab documented that is suspected to increase the flow of methane and sulfide, the bacterial food, towards the bacteria. The two sexes of the new South West Indian Ridge species prefer different temperatures, with males seeming to prefer warmer water and egg-carrying females and juveniles preferring the coldest.

The genus Kiwa is named after "the goddess of the shellfish in the Polynesian mythology".

Internal anatomy
Internal anatomy has been studied in Kiwa puravida.

Digestive system:
The stomach (gastric mill + pylorus) is situated in the upper anterior portion of the cephalothorax. The gut extends as a tube to the telson. A pair of short anterior ceca emanates from the transition between pylorus and gut, appearing as short tubes. The hepatopancreas fills most of the cephalothorax and parts of the pleon and is formed by two bunches of tubular diverticles which are each connected to the pylorus via a main duct. The stomach is embedded ventrally by the hepatopancreas whose anterior diverticles reach into the rostrum.

Antennal glands:
The antennal glands are flatenned and located anterolaterally in the cephalothorax, near the second antennae. the lobes of the antennal bladder are situated anteriorly and laterally to the stomach and cover a large portion of the hepatopancreas.

Reproductive system:
The testes are paired and restricted to the cephalothorax. They are connected to the vasa deferentia on each side which run to the gonopores on the coxae of the eighth thoracic segment.

Nervous system:
The brain is the anteriormost part of the central nervous system. It is relatively small compared to the rest of the body. Emanating from the brain several nerves run to the sensory organs (eyes, antennulae, antennae). A pair of circumesophageal ("surrounding the esophagus") connectives connect the brain with the cephalothoracic ganglion. The latter is a compaction of several neuromeres in the lower part of the anterior cephalothorax. These neuromeres correspond morphologically with the body segments of the mandibles and the 1st and 2nd maxillae, the thoracic segments I-VIII and the first pleonal segment. 
The 2nd to 6th pleonal neuromeres form separate ganglia. They are arranged in an irregular segmental pattern with the sixth pleonal segment reaching into the sixth pleonal segment.

Circulatory system:
The heart is located in the upper portion of the cephalothorax below the carapace and above the anterior portion of the gut. The heart is suspended by several ligaments within the pericardial sinus which is bordered by the pericardial septum. Three pairs of openings (ostia) connect sinus and interior heart space. The interior heart is crossed by asymmetrical arranged muscular bundles which are part of the heart muscle (myocard). Seven arteries which can be categorized into five artery systems (two paired, three unpaired) emanate from the heart and run to the respective organs and body regions. After having left the arteries and having washed around the tissues the "blood" (hemolymph) is channelled to the gill (branchial) sinus via crevices (lacunae) and channels (sinus). After its oxygenation the hemolymph is returning to the pericardial sinus via the branchio-pericardial sinus.

Muscle systems:
The general structure and organization of the various muscle systems in Kiwa (puravida) is congruent with that of other decapods.

References

External links 

Squat lobsters
Decapod genera